Perutz is a surname. Notable people with the surname include:

Leo Perutz (1882–1957), Czech-Austrian novelist and mathematician
Max Ferdinand Perutz (1914–2002), Austrian-British molecular biologist
Robin Perutz, son of Max, chemist
Otto Perutz (1847–1922), Czech-German chemist

See also
Peretz